Ohio's 24th senatorial district has always been based in Cuyahoga County, but has encompassed different regions over the decades.  It now consists of outer suburbs from the eastern to the western portions of the county.  It encompasses Ohio House districts 6, 7 and 16.  It has a Cook PVI of R+2.  Its Ohio Senator is Republican Matt Dolan.  He resides in Chagrin Falls, a city located in Cuyahoga County.

List of senators

References

External links
Ohio's 24th district senator at the 133rd Ohio General Assembly official website

Ohio State Senate districts